David Victor, born David Vikodetz, (August 22, 1910 – October 18, 1989) was an American producer and screenwriter. He won an Primetime Emmy Award and was nominated for four more in the categories Outstanding Drama Series and Outstanding Single Program for his work on the television programs The Name of the Game, Marcus Welby, M.D. and also the television film Vanished. 

Victor died in October 1989 of a heart attack in Virginia, at the age of 79.

References

External links 

1910 births
1989 deaths
People from Odesa
Emigrants from the Russian Empire to the United States
American film producers
American television producers
American male screenwriters
American television writers
American male television writers
Ukrainian film producers
Ukrainian producers
Ukrainian screenwriters
20th-century American male writers
20th-century Ukrainian writers